was a Japanese daimyō of the early Edo period.

Born under the name Nagatomimaru (長福丸), he was the 10th son of Tokugawa Ieyasu, by his concubine Kageyama-dono. On December 8, 1603, Yorinobu received the fief of Mito, then rated at 200,000 koku, as his fief. Mito had formerly belonged to his older brother, Takeda Nobuyoshi. Following his stipend increase to 250,000 koku in October 1604, he came of age on September 12, 1606, taking the name Yorimasa, and receiving the court rank of junior 4th, lower grade (ju-shi-i-ge) and the title of Hitachi no Suke. On January 6, 1610, he was transferred to a 500,000 koku fief in Suruga and Tōtōmi Provinces (thereby founding Sunpu Domain centered on Sunpu Castle), and took the name Yorinobu. However, after a little under a decade in Suruga, he was transferred to the 550,000 koku Wakayama Domain on August 27, 1619, following the transfer of the previous rulers, the Asano clan, to Hiroshima, in Aki Province. Yorinobu thus became the founder of the Kii branch of the Tokugawa family. Yorinobu's wife, Yorin-in (1601-1666) was the daughter of Katō Kiyomasa. By the end of his life, Yorinobu had achieved junior 2nd court rank (ju-ni-i), as well as holding the title of dainagon ("major counselor").

Yorinobu had four children: his successor Tokugawa Mitsusada, Yorizumi, the founder of the Iyo-Saijo Domain, Inaba-hime, who married Ikeda Mitsunaka of the Tottori Domain, and Matsuhime, who married Matsudaira Nobuhira of the Yoshii Domain. Following his death, he was referred to by the title Nanryū-in.

In 1915, Yorinobu was posthumously promoted to senior 2nd court rank (shō-ni-i).

Family
 Father: Tokugawa Ieyasu
 Mother: Kageyama-dono (1580–1653) later Yoju-in
 Wife: Yasohime later Yorin-in (1601-1666)
 Concubines:
 Yamada-dono
 Nakagawa-dono
 Ochi no Kata
 Children:
 Tokugawa Mitsusada by Nakagawa-dono
 Shuri by Yamada-dono
 Matsudaira Yorizumi (1641-1711) by Ochi no Kata
 Inabahime married Ikeda Mitsunaka by Ochi no Kata
 Matsuhime married Matsudaira Nobuhira by Ochi no Kata

Ancestry

References

See also

Chōhō-ji

References

External links
Portrait of Yorinobu

1602 births
1671 deaths
Kishū-Tokugawa clan
Shinpan daimyo